Harris Arcade, also known as the Arcade Building, is a historic commercial building located at Hickory, Catawba County, North Carolina. It was built in 1938, and is a two-story, brick Commercial Style building, with Tudor Revival-Style arched arcade openings. It features an eight-foot wide arcade  passage with a broken-tile terrazzo floor and intact late-interwar period commercial space.

It was listed on the National Register of Historic Places in 2008.

References

Hickory, North Carolina
Commercial buildings on the National Register of Historic Places in North Carolina
Commercial buildings completed in 1938
Tudor Revival architecture in North Carolina
Buildings and structures in Catawba County, North Carolina
National Register of Historic Places in Catawba County, North Carolina